The Jim Nabors Hour is an American variety television series hosted by Jim Nabors that aired on the CBS television network from 1969 to 1971.

Fresh from his success with Gomer Pyle, U.S.M.C., which put his backwoods "Gomer Pyle" character from The Andy Griffith Show in a military context, the show not only built on that success, but also displayed his baritone singing voice, which had been used on the Pyle show on occasion and had earned Nabors several gold records in the late 1960s.

Two of Nabors' co-stars from Gomer Pyle, Ronnie Schell and Frank Sutton, appeared as regulars along with Karen Morrow and many guest stars.  The Tony Mordente Dancers and the Nabors Kids provided musical support for the song and dance routines.

The show was consistently in the top thirty and performed strongly in its time slot, but fell victim to the CBS "rural purge" and was axed by the network after two seasons; the last episode was broadcast on March 11, 1971.

References

External links
 
Episode Guide on Ultimate70s

Jim Nabors Hour, The
Jim Nabors Hour, The
Jim Nabors Hour, The
Jim Nabors Hour, The
Jim Nabors Hour, The
English-language television shows